Trust Fall (Side B) is the fifth EP by rock band Incubus. It was released on April 17, 2020. Side B serves as a sequel to Trust Fall (Side A), which was released in 2015.

Track listing

Personnel
Incubus
 Brandon Boyd – lead vocals
 Michael Einziger – guitars
 Jose Pasillas II – drums
 Chris Kilmore – piano, keyboards, turntables
 Ben Kenney – bass, backing vocals

Charts

References

2020 EPs
Incubus (band) albums